The 1993 NCAA Women's Gymnastics championship involved 12 schools competing for the national championship of women's NCAA Division I gymnastics.  It was the twelfth NCAA gymnastics national championship and the defending NCAA Team Champion for 1992 was Utah.  The Competition took place in Corvallis, Oregon, hosted by Oregon State University in the Gill Coliseum. The 1993 Championship was won by the Georgia Gym Dogs with the first 198 in NCAA Championship history.

Team Results

Session 1

Session 2

Super Six

External links
  Gym Results

NCAA Women's Gymnastics championship
College sports in Oregon
Oregon State Beavers women's gymnastics
1993 in women's gymnastics